A1 Team Italy is the Italian team of A1 Grand Prix, an international racing series.

Management 

A1 Team Italy owner is Piercarlo Ghinzani.

History

2008–09 season 

Drivers: Edoardo Piscopo, Fabio Onidi

For the 2008–09 season, Edoardo Piscopo will be returning to drive for the team, and will be joined by Fabio Onidi, a Euroseries 3000 racer. The traditional dark blue livery of the car has also been changed to a red, white and green livery.

2007–08 season 

Drivers: Edoardo Piscopo, Enrico Toccacelo

Team Italy scored on just five occasions, finishing 18th in the championship with 12 points.

2006–07 season 

Drivers: Alessandro Pier Guidi, Enrico Toccacelo

The season was moderately successful for the team, with three podiums and a victory, scoring 52 points, and finishing 7th in the championship.

2005–06 season 

Drivers: Massimiliano Busnelli, Max Papis, Enrico Toccacelo

In the inaugural season, Team Italy scored two podiums en route to 14th place in the championship with 46 points.

Drivers

Complete A1 Grand Prix results 

(key), "spr" indicate a Sprint Race, "fea" indicate a Main Race.

References

External links
A1gp.com Official A1 Grand Prix Web Site

Italy A1 team
Italian auto racing teams
National sports teams of Italy
Auto racing teams established in 2005
Auto racing teams disestablished in 2009